The Ministry of Joseph de Villèle was formed on 14 December 1821 after the dismissal of the Second ministry of Armand-Emmanuel du Plessis de Richelieu by King Louis XVIII of France.

During this ministry King Louis XVIII of France died on 16 September 1824.
He was succeeded by his brother, who became King Charles X of France.
After the elections of November 1827, which were unfavorable to the government, the ministry was dismissed on 6 December 1827.
The king asked Villèle not to announce the change until a new ministry had been formed.
The ministry was replaced on 4 January 1828 by the Ministry of Jean-Baptiste de Martignac.

Ministers
The ministers were:

Changes
On 28 December 1822:

On 4 August 1824:

On 11 August 1824:

References

Sources

French governments
1821 establishments in France
1827 disestablishments in France
Cabinets established in 1821
Cabinets disestablished in 1827